Matt Hyde (born June 19, 1964) is an American producer, engineer, mixer and musician. From 1982 to 1985 he attended Berklee College of Music in Boston. While still at Berklee in 1984, he obtained an internship at Pyramid Recording Studio in Boston. After two semesters at Berklee, Hyde took a break from classes to tour for the Department of Defense overseas entertainment program, playing guitar and keyboards in several top 40 cover bands that played shows at U.S. military bases in foreign countries throughout Europe and the Pacific. When he returned to the U.S., he began working at recording studios, first in Boston and from 1989 in Los Angeles.

While working as a staff engineer at Paramount Recording Studios in Los Angeles, Hyde worked with Cypress Hill in preparation for their debut album. He produced several other notable hip hop acts including Freestyle Fellowship, Boo Yaa T.R.I.B.E., and Daddy Freddy.

Matt Hyde met Perry Farrell and produced (with Perry) tracks on the debut album for Porno for Pyros, as well as Good God's Urge. Hyde was so involved with the group that he appeared on the artwork for the single "Sadness" (he is in the center holding the small keyboard), as well as in the video for that song.

Hyde has been credited as engineer, producer, mixer and/or mastering engineer on notable albums including No Doubt's Tragic Kingdom, Monster Magnet's Powertrip, Slayer's God Hates Us All, Hatebreed's Perseverance, Parkway Drive's Atlas, and two Deftones albums.

In 2006, Hyde was recognized for engineering Jonny Lang's album Turn Around, which won a Grammy in the Best Rock or Rap Gospel category.

Discography

References

External links 
 http://mcdman.com/hyde
 https://consequence.net/2016/04/album-review-deftones-gore/
 http://www.allmusic.com/artist/matt-hyde-mn0000379883/credits
 

1964 births
Living people
American record producers
American audio engineers
Berklee College of Music alumni
Place of birth missing (living people)
American heavy metal guitarists
American keyboardists
20th-century American guitarists